The Portuguese Volleyball League A2  was the second men's Volleyball league in Portugal, which is also called (Portuguese: "Campeonato Nacional de Voleibol - A2"), until 2010/2011.

The competition was organized by the Federação Portuguesa de Voleibol and it was a closed competition, to gain promotion to A1 Volleyball League (Portugal) clubs must apply.

After the 2010/2011 season, The Portuguese Volleyball League A2 was cancelled, and Portuguese Volleyball Second Division become the second tier in Portuguese volleyball system.

Portuguese League Champions - A2

References

League, Portuguese Volleyball